Asaak, Arsacia (Latin) or Arshak (Parthian) was an ancient city which was a capital and royal necropolis of the Parthian Empire. Many of the Parthian kings such as Arsaces I were crowned in Asaak.

Some has suggested it to be identified with the Old City near Quchan, Iran in the upper Atrek River valley.

References

Sources 
 
 

Parthian cities
Archaeological sites in Iran
History of Razavi Khorasan Province
Nishapur Quarter
Lost ancient cities and towns